Parc Naturel Régional de la Chartreuse (Chartreuse Regional Nature Park) is a regional nature park located in the region Rhône-Alpes between Chambéry, Grenoble and Voiron, on the border of the departments of Isère and Savoie. It is based on the massif de la Chartreuse and covers an area of 76,700 hectares with a population of about 50,000. The park was established in 1995.

Gallery

See also 
Regional nature parks of France

References

External links 

 

Regional natural parks of France
Geography of Isère